Omar Longart (born 18 May 1991 in El Tigre, Anzoátegui) is a Venezuelan sprinter.

Career
He competed in the 4 × 400 m relay event at the 2012 Summer Olympics and the 2016 Summer Olympics.

Personal bests
400 m: 46.09 s A –  Medellín, 20 March 2010

Achievements

References

External links
 
 
 Tilastopaja biography

People from El Tigre
Venezuelan male sprinters
1991 births
Living people
Olympic athletes of Venezuela
Athletes (track and field) at the 2012 Summer Olympics
Athletes (track and field) at the 2016 Summer Olympics
Pan American Games medalists in athletics (track and field)
Pan American Games bronze medalists for Venezuela
Athletes (track and field) at the 2011 Pan American Games
Athletes (track and field) at the 2019 Pan American Games
South American Games gold medalists for Venezuela
South American Games medalists in athletics
Competitors at the 2010 South American Games
Medalists at the 2011 Pan American Games
21st-century Venezuelan people